Nikola Márová is a Czech ballerina. Since 2006, she has been a principal dancer at the National Theatre in Prague.

Her role as Odette/Odile in Swan Lake earned her a Thalia Award in 2008. She is married to Alexander Katsapov, also a principal dancer at the National Theatre, and has a son.

References 

Czech ballerinas
Prima ballerinas
Year of birth missing (living people)
Living people
Recipients of the Thalia Award